Summer Meng (born 20 July 1991) is a Taiwanese actress known for her roles in television series such as Sweet Sweet Bodyguard (2012), Aim High (2014), and Love, Timeless (2017). She got nominated for Best Actress at the 53rd Golden Bell Awards, Taiwan's most prestigious television awards, for her role in Wake Up 2.

Personal life
Before becoming an actress, she studied dancing. She has dated television host Mickey Huang since 2014 before they registered their marriage on March 5, 2020.

Filmography

Television series

Film

Music videos

Awards and nominations

References

External links

 
 
  

1991 births
Living people
Taiwanese television actresses
Taiwanese film actresses
21st-century Taiwanese actresses
Actresses from Taipei
Shih Chien University alumni